Golgun (also Romanized as Golgūn; also known as Kolgūn) is a village in Sohr va Firuzan Rural District, Pir Bakran District, Falavarjan County, Isfahan Province, Iran. At the 2006 census, its population was 265, in 73 families.

References 

Populated places in Falavarjan County